The 2014 Formula Renault 2.0 Northern European Cup was the ninth Formula Renault 2.0 Northern European Cup season, an open-wheel motor racing series for emerging young racing drivers based in Europe. It was contested over 7 race meetings and a total of 15 races – 17 scheduled races, with 2 cancelled due to weather conditions – commencing on 12 April at Monza and concluding on 20 September at the Nürburgring.

The championship title was won by British driver Ben Barnicoat, a member of McLaren's young driver programme, after recording top-ten finishes in all but two of the season's races. Barnicoat, who won races at Hockenheim and Most, finished 16 points clear of his closest rival, Louis Delétraz, who was the winner of the opening race of the season, at Monza. Third place in the championship was settled via a tie-break, as Seb Morris and Steijn Schothorst finished level on points; the tie was settled in favour of Morris, as his two wins – at Silverstone and Assen – gave him the advantage over Schothorst's sole win, at Spa.

Over the course of the season, 11 different drivers won a race. Aside from Barnicoat and Morris, other drivers to win twice were Gustav Malja, who finished fifth in the championship, and Kevin Jörg, who only contested four meetings during the season. Single race victories were taken by full-time series competitor Callan O'Keeffe, Andrea Pizzitola, Levin Amweg, Alexander Albon and Aurélien Panis, however none of the quintet finished higher than O'Keeffe's seventh place in the final championship standings. The teams' championship was won by Josef Kaufmann Racing, thanks to the results of Delétraz, Malja, Jörg and Ryan Tveter.

Drivers and teams

Race calendar and results
The seven-event calendar for the 2014 season was announced on 12 December 2013.

Championship standings

Drivers' championship
 Championship points were awarded on a 30, 24, 20, 17, 16, 15, 14, 13, 12, 11, 10, 9, 8, 7, 6, 5, 4, 3, 2, 1 to the top 20 classified finishers in each race.

Teams' championship

References

External links
 

NEC
Formula Renault 2.0 NEC
Formula Renault 2.0 NEC
Renault NEC